Cho-airong station is a railway station located in Chuap Subdistrict, Cho-airong District, Narathiwat.

South Thailand insurgency events 
 On 3 January 2011, separatists planted a bomb near the railway between Pa Phai-Cho-airong, followed by shootings on 3 patrol soldiers. As a result, all 3 were seriously injured and sent to Cho-airong Hospital afterwards.
 On 8 June 2011, separatists shot locals at Cho-airong railway station before igniting a hidden bomb in a vegetable-selling stall, injuring 6 people. The injured people included locals, police, military volunteers and the assistant district officer of Cho-airong District.
 In May 2014, bombs exploded on 2 railway bridges within the Cho-airong Area, causing 1–2 days suspension of rail services in the area.
All events were part of the South Thailand Insurgency.

Services 
 Rapid No. 171/172 Bangkok-Sungai Kolok-Bangkok
 Rapid No. 175/176 Hat Yai Junction-Sungai Kolok-Hat Yai Junction
 Local No. 447/448 Surat Thani-Sungai Kolok-Surat Thani
 Local No. 451/452 Nakhon Si Thammarat-Sungai Kolok-Nakhon Si Thammarat
 Local No. 453/454 Yala-Sungai Kolok-Yala
 Local No. 463/464 Phatthalung-Sungai Kolok-Phatthalung

References 

 
 

Railway stations in Thailand